is a subprefecture of Hokkaido Prefecture, Japan.

Geography 
Located in south-central Hokkaido, Iburi stretches  East-West and  North-South. Iburi borders Oshima Subprefecture to the West, Shiribeshi, Ishikari, and Sorachi Subprefectures to the North, and Hidaka Subprefecture to the East. On its South side, Iburi has  of coastline with the Pacific Ocean.

Municipalities

Mergers

History 
1897: Muroran Subprefecture was established.
1922: Muroran Subprefecture was renamed Iburi Subprefecture.

References

External links
Official website 

Subprefectures in Hokkaido